Glenn Spearing (born 1 June 1985) is a former Irish professional darts player. He currently plays in Professional Darts Corporation events.

Career
Spearing was a prolific winner of Irish darts tournaments in 2012 and 2013 as he picked up eight titles during that time. In 2014, he entered Qualifying School in an attempt to join the PDC circuit full-time, coming closest on the final day when he lost in the last 32 to Joe Murnan. For competing he earned PDPA associate member status which gave him entry into UK Open and European Tour qualifiers. Spearing qualified for the German Darts Championship and beat Magnus Caris 6–2, before being whitewashed 6–0 by Gary Anderson in the last 32 which represents his deepest run in a PDC event to date. Spearing also qualified for the UK Open for the time, but lost 5–2 to Antonio Alcinas in the first round.

References

External links

1985 births
Living people
Irish darts players
Professional Darts Corporation associate players